The 1968 United States Senate election in Nevada was held on November 5, 1968. Incumbent Democratic U.S. Senator Alan Bible was re-elected to a third term in office over Republican Edward Fike.

General election

Candidates
Alan Bible, incumbent U.S. Senator since 1954 (Democratic)
Edward Fike, former Lieutenant Governor of Nevada (Republican)

Results

See also 
 1968 United States Senate elections

References

Nevada
1968
United States Senate